The 1992 New Hampshire Wildcats football team was an American football team that represented the University of New Hampshire as a member of the Yankee Conference during the 1992 NCAA Division I-AA football season. In its 21st year under head coach Bill Bowes, the team compiled a 5–5–1 record (3–5 against conference opponents) and finished seventh of nine teams in the Yankee Conference.

Schedule

References

New Hampshire
New Hampshire Wildcats football seasons
New Hampshire Wildcats football